Allison Brooks Janney (born November 19, 1959) is an American actress. In a career spanning three decades, she is known for her performances across multiple genres of screen and stage. Janney has received various accolades, including an Academy Award, a British Academy Film Award, a Golden Globe Award, and seven Primetime Emmy Awards, in addition to nominations for two Tony Awards.

Born in Boston and raised in Dayton, Ohio, Janney received a scholarship to study at the Royal Academy of Dramatic Art following her graduation from Kenyon College. After years of minor and uncredited film and television appearances, Janney's breakthrough came with the role of C. J. Cregg in the NBC political drama The West Wing (1999–2006), for which she received four Primetime Emmy Awards. In 2014, she won the Primetime Emmy Award for Outstanding Guest Actress in a Drama Series for her role as Margaret Scully on the Showtime period drama Masters of Sex. For her portrayal of Bonnie Plunkett, a cynical recovering addict on the CBS sitcom Mom (2013–2021), Janney received six Primetime Emmy Award nominations and won twice for Outstanding Supporting Actress in a Comedy Series.

Janney made her professional stage debut with the Off-Broadway production Ladies (1989), and followed with numerous bit parts in various similar productions, before making her Broadway debut with the 1996 revival of Present Laughter. She won two Drama Desk Awards and has been nominated for two Tony Awards: for Best Actress in a Play for her performance in the Broadway revival of A View from the Bridge (1997), and for Best Actress in a Musical for her role in the original Broadway production of the musical 9 to 5 (2009).

Her film roles include Private Parts (1997), Primary Colors (1998), 10 Things I Hate About You (1999), Drop Dead Gorgeous (1999), American Beauty (1999), Nurse Betty (2000), The Hours (2002), Hairspray (2007), Juno (2007), The Help (2011), The Way, Way Back (2013), Tammy (2014), The Rewrite (2014), Spy (2015), Tallulah (2016), The Girl on the Train (2016), Bad Education (2019) and Bombshell (2019). She voiced roles in Finding Nemo (2003), Over the Hedge (2006), Minions (2015), and The Addams Family (2019). For her performance in the black comedy I, Tonya (2017), Janney won an Academy Award, a BAFTA Award, and a Golden Globe Award, all for Best Supporting Actress.

Early life and education

Janney was born on November 19, 1959, in Boston, Massachusetts, and raised in Dayton, Ohio. She is the daughter of Macy Brooks Janney (née Putnam), a former actress, and Jervis Spencer Janney Jr., a real estate developer and jazz musician. She has an older brother, Jay and had a younger brother, Hal (1961–2011). Hal, who had battled depression and addiction for many years, died by suicide in 2011 at the age of 49.

She attended the Miami Valley School in Dayton, where she was named a distinguished alumna in 2005, and the Hotchkiss School in Connecticut, where she was named Alumna of the Year in 2016. Janney initially aspired to a career in figure skating, but her tall stature and a freak accident when she was a teenager put an end to that dream. She attended Kenyon College in Gambier, Ohio, where she majored in theatre. During her freshman year, Janney met actors Paul Newman and Joanne Woodward at a play for the inaugural event of the college's newly built Bolton Theater, which Newman was directing. The couple encouraged her to continue acting and offered her guidance during the early days in her career. She went on to train at the Neighborhood Playhouse School of the Theatre in New York and then received a scholarship to study at the Royal Academy of Dramatic Art in mid-1984.

Career

Television

1990s: Television debut and early work 
Janney's first role on television was in the short-lived black-and-white faux-1940s comedy Morton & Hayes; she appeared in two episodes of the 1991 CBS series as Eddie Hayes' wife. She then moved on to soap operas; she played the short-term role of Vi Kaminski on As the World Turns, and then played the recurring role of Ginger, one of the Spaulding maids, on Guiding Light for nearly two years. In the spring of 1994, she appeared in the season-four finale of Law & Order, titled "Old Friends", as a reluctant witness against a member of the Russian mob. She was also a cast member on the radio show A Prairie Home Companion.

1999–2007: Critical recognition and The West Wing 
After a decade of small and uncredited parts, Janney had her breakthrough when she was cast as White House Press Secretary C. J. Cregg in the NBC political drama The West Wing. Creator Aaron Sorkin called Janney to audition for the role after seeing her in the film Primary Colors. Loosely based on Dee Dee Myers, the press secretary during Clinton administration, C. J. is a National Merit Scholar who ultimately succeeds Leo McGarry as White House Chief of Staff. Writing for The Atlantic, John Reid says that "her capability and combination of strength and simple compassion represented the fantasy of the Bartlet White House better than anyone." The publication also ranks her as the best character from the series. In their ranking of the best characters from all the television series created by Sorkin, Vulture, ranks C. J. at No. 2 and says; "If all the Sorkin women were as classy, self-assured, and legitimately funny (the turkey pardon!) as C. J., we'd never have had the Sorkin woman argument in the first place". For her portrayal of C. J. Cregg, Janney won four Primetime Emmy Awards, four Screen Actors Guild Award, a Satellite Award and four nominations for the Golden Globe Awards, making her the most awarded cast member of the series.

2002–2011: Continued guest roles 
Janney guest starred on the sitcom Frasier in a 2002 episode Three Blind Dates and appeared in the short-lived Studio 60 on the Sunset Strip in a guest appearance as herself in the episode "The Disaster Show". In late 2009, she was chosen to play the role of Sheila Jackson in the pilot episode of Shameless, but when Showtime picked up the series, she was replaced after the pilot by Joan Cusack. In 2010, Janney appeared as Allison Pearson in In Plain Sight. In May 2010, she appeared in the antepenultimate episode of the ABC television series Lost as the adoptive mother of the show's two mythological opponents, Jacob and The Man in Black. She starred in the ABC network comedy Mr. Sunshine. The series, which was created by Matthew Perry, was a mid-season replacement for the 2010–11 television season.

2013–2021: Mom, Masters of Sex, and other roles 
Following few short-lived shows and a brief sabbatical from television, Janney returned to the small screen with the CBS sitcom Mom, which ran from 2013 until 2021. Janney played Bonnie Plunkett, a self-centered, cynical recovering addict who tries to regain the love and trust of her daughter (played by Anna Faris). She was influenced to take on the role following the death of her younger brother from drug addiction, as well as her longtime desire to work on multicam comedy. For her performance on the series, Janney garnered critical acclaim and six Primetime Emmy Award nominations, winning twice as Outstanding Supporting Actress in a Comedy Series. She also received six nominations at the Critics' Choice Television Awards winning twice for Best Supporting Actress in a Comedy Series.

From 2014 to 2016, Janney guest-starred in Showtime's period drama Masters of Sex, portraying a sexually repressed homemaker in 1950s who struggles to understand the disintegration of her marriage. Her performance received praise with Janney receiving three consecutive nominations for the Primetime Emmy Award for Outstanding Guest Actress in a Drama Series winning one in 2014, and winning the Critics' Choice Television Award for Best Guest Performer in a Drama Series.

Janney appeared as herself, in an episode of the second season of the Netflix series The Kominsky Method. On the Disney Channel animated show Phineas and Ferb, Janney voiced Charlene.

In 2022, Janney appeared in an episode of Who Do You Think You Are? in which she learned she was descended from Stephen Hopkins, one of the settlers on the Mayflower.

Film

1989–2005: Early roles and beginnings 
Janney made her film debut with a minor part in Who Shot Pat? (1989). This was followed by a series of minor roles in numerous films throughout the 1990s, including; Wolf, The Object of My Affection, Big Night, The Impostors, Drop Dead Gorgeous, The Ice Storm, Primary Colors, 10 Things I Hate About You, Private Parts, and American Beauty. For the last of these she won the Screen Actors Guild Award and Critics' Choice Movie Award for Best Acting Ensemble. She also appeared in Nurse Betty (2000), The Hours (2002), Finding Nemo (2003), How to Deal (2003), The Chumscrubber (2005), Winter Solstice (2004), and Our Very Own (2005). For the last of these, she received a nomination for the Independent Spirit Award for Best Supporting Female.

2007–2016: Established character actress 
In 2007, Janney starred in Jason Reitman's comedy-drama Juno, playing Bren MacGuff, the titular character's stepmother. In the same year, she appeared in the musical Hairspray, and won the Austin Film Critics Association Award for Best Supporting Actress and the Critics' Choice Movie Awards for Best Acting Ensemble. In 2010, Janney earned praise for her performance in Todd Solondz's comedy-drama Life During Wartime.

In 2011, Janney appeared in Tate Taylor's period drama The Help, which won the Screen Actors Guild Award and Critics' Choice Movie Award for Best Acting Ensemble. She also appeared in Margaret (2011), Struck by Lightning (2012), Liberal Arts (2012), Spy (2015), The DUFF (2015), Miss Peregrine's Home for Peculiar Children (2016), Tallulah (2016), and The Girl on the Train (2016).

2017–2022: Awards success and continued work 
In 2017, Janney starred in Craig Gillespie's black comedy I, Tonya, based on the life of figure skater Tonya Harding. Screenwriter Steven Rogers wrote the role of LaVona specifically for Janney and refused to sell his screenplay until Janney was cast in the film. Janney would consider the part as one of the most challenging of her career. Janney earned numerous accolades for her performance in the film including the Academy Award, Golden Globe, Screen Actors Guild Award, Critics' Choice Movie Award, Independent Spirit Award, and BAFTA Award for Best Supporting Actress.

Janney appeared in five movies in 2019. She had cameo appearances in the family comedy Troop Zero, the psychological thriller Ma, and Bombshell. For the last of these she received nominations at the Screen Actors Guild Award, and Critics' Choice Movie Award Best Acting Ensemble. Janney also voiced for the role of Margaux Needler in the animated version of The Addams Family. Janney also appeared in Bad Education and Tate Taylor's comedy-drama Breaking News in Yuba County. She also had the title role in J. J. Abrams's thriller Lou.

Upcoming projects 
Janney is currently in production with two films: the comedy The People We Hate at the Wedding and the sci-fi film True Love.

Theater

1989–1996: Career beginnings in theatre 
Janney made her professional stage debut in 1989 with an uncredited part in the Off-Broadway production Ladies. Following minor roles in similar productions like; Prescribed Laughter In The Emergency Café, Five Women Wearing the Same Dress and Blue Window, Janney made her Broadway debut with the 1996 revival of Noël Coward's Present Laughter. She played Liz Essendine, the estranged wife of the lead character (played by Frank Langella). Although a minor role, her performance garnered praise and attention with The New York Times calling it "The most fully accomplished performance on the stage". For her performance in the play, Janney won the Theatre World Award, Clarence Derwent Award for Most Promising Female, Outer Critics Circle Award for Outstanding Featured Actress in a Play and received a nomination for the Drama Desk Award for Outstanding Featured Actress in a Play.

1998–2009: A View from the Bridge and 9 to 5 
Janney starred in the 1998 revival of Arthur Miller's A View from the Bridge to positive reviews. For her performance, Janney won the Drama Desk Award for Outstanding Featured Actress in a Play, Outer Critics Circle Award for Outstanding Actress in a Play, and received a nomination for the Tony Award for Best Actress in a Play.

In 2009, Janney starred in the musical 9 to 5 alongside Stephanie J. Block and Megan Hilty. Her performance garnered positive reviews, and Janney earned the Drama Desk Award for Outstanding Actress in a Musical and a nomination for the Tony Award for Best Actress in a Musical.

2017: Return to theatre and critical acclaim 
In 2017, Janney returned to Broadway with the revival of John Guare's Six Degrees of Separation in the role of Ouisa Kittredge. Janney received nominations for the Drama Desk Award for Outstanding Actress in a Play, Drama League Award for Distinguished Performance and won the Outer Critics Circle Award for Outstanding Actress in a Play.

Personal life

Janney has never been married and has no children, of which she said: "I’ve never had that instinct to have kids, I’m at peace with it". She was romantically involved with computer programmer Dennis Gagomiros. The couple began dating in 1994, and were interested in getting married but ended their relationship after seven years together in 2001. In 2002, she met actor Richard Jenik (her co-star in Our Very Own). The couple got engaged in 2004 but broke up two years later in 2006. In 2012, Janney met production manager Philip Joncas. The two met on the set of The Way, Way Back and began dating soon after. The couple dated for five years before ending their relationship in 2017.

In interviews related to her role on Mom, Janney discussed her brother, Hal, who fought drug addiction for years before his suicide. She has credited playing her character on Mom to people fighting addiction. On March 4, 2018, Janney dedicated her Academy Award win to him during her acceptance speech.

In 2004, she began lending her voice to television and radio spots created by Kaiser Permanente in the health maintenance organization's broad "Thrive" media campaign, and in a radio campaign for the American Institute of Architects. In September 2010, it was announced that Janney would be the voice of the Aly San San spokesdroid in the Disney attraction Star Tours – The Adventures Continue. The attraction later opened at Disney's Hollywood Studios and Disneyland. In October 2016, Janney became the first woman to receive the Alumni Award of The Hotchkiss School and received a star on the Hollywood Walk of Fame for her work in the entertainment industry, located at 6100 Hollywood Boulevard.

Activism
Janney has campaigned for numerous issues like women's rights, LGBTQ rights, mental health, animal rights, and addiction recovery. In 2018, Janney participated in the 2018 Women's March in Los Angeles, part of a larger national movement for women's rights, human rights, and social justice. She supports various charities including American Heart Association, American Stroke Association, Broadway Cares/Equity Fights AIDS, and GLAAD.

In 2016, Janney was honored at the White House at the event "Champions of Change", which honored 10 accomplished individuals from across the country who were being recognized for advancing addiction prevention, treatment, and recovery. She also participated in a panel discussion with Surgeon General Vivek Murthy to talk about the portrayal of addiction and recovery in the media. In 2017, Janney donated $250,000 to Planned Parenthood. In 2020 with the outbreak of COVID-19 pandemic, Janney donated $10,000 to the Dayton Foodbank, an organization providing food to the homeless.

Janney has also been an active supporter of voter registration, posting about voter ID issues and suggesting fans check VoteRiders for details. She and her West Wing costars were part of Michelle Obama's When We All Vote initiative. More recently, she participated in Divas for Democracy: United We Slay, a streaming variety show supporting voter registration.

Filmography

Film

Television

Theatre

Music video

Awards and nominations

See also
 List of Kenyon College people
 List of Primetime Emmy Award winners
 List of stars on the Hollywood Walk of Fame
 List of actors with Academy Award nominations
 List of alumni of the Royal Academy of Dramatic Art

References

External links

 
 
 
 
 
 
  The Guardian

1959 births
Living people
20th-century American actresses
21st-century American actresses
Actresses from Boston
Actresses from Dayton, Ohio
Actresses from Massachusetts
Alumni of RADA
American film actresses
American musical theatre actresses
American soap opera actresses
American stage actresses
American television actresses
American voice actresses
Audiobook narrators
Best Supporting Actress AACTA International Award winners
Best Supporting Actress Academy Award winners
Best Supporting Actress BAFTA Award winners
Best Supporting Actress Golden Globe (film) winners
Drama Desk Award winners
Hotchkiss School alumni
Independent Spirit Award for Best Supporting Female winners
Kenyon College alumni
Neighborhood Playhouse School of the Theatre alumni
Outstanding Performance by a Cast in a Motion Picture Screen Actors Guild Award winners
Outstanding Performance by a Female Actor in a Drama Series Screen Actors Guild Award winners
Outstanding Performance by a Female Actor in a Supporting Role Screen Actors Guild Award winners
Outstanding Performance by a Lead Actress in a Drama Series Primetime Emmy Award winners
Outstanding Performance by a Supporting Actress in a Comedy Series Primetime Emmy Award winners
Outstanding Performance by a Supporting Actress in a Drama Series Primetime Emmy Award winners
Theatre World Award winners